St. Anthony High School was a four-year co-educational Catholic high school in Jersey City known for its high-powered basketball program coached by Bob Hurley, Sr. The school closed in 2017.

It operated under the supervision of the Archdiocese of Newark and was affiliated for much of its history with St. Anthony of Padua Catholic Church, which owns the building. The school had been accredited by the Middle States Association of Colleges and Schools Commission on Elementary and Secondary Schools since 1997.

History

Beginnings 
The school was originally founded to serve the Padua parish, made up of Polish Americans and their children. Over time, the school's demographics shifted along with the local neighborhood, to a predominantly Black and Hispanic population.

Basketball success 
Beginning in the 1960s under Bob Hurley, Sr., the school was known for its boys' basketball program, which won the state championship nearly every year and produced a number of successful NBA players.

Closure 
The school struggled with funding and declining enrollments for many decades; however, funding always managed to be found. As of the 2013–14 school year, the high school had 224 students and 16.0 classroom teachers (on an FTE basis), the school had a student–teacher ratio of 14.0:1. There were 59 students in 9th grade, 68 students in 10th grade, 52 students in 11th grade, and 45 students in 12th grade.

In the 2015–2016 school year there were 200 students, and 2016–2017 school year there were 183 students. In September 2016 the board of trustees announced that the community needed to raise $15–20 million in order to keep the school open. In September 2016 Patrick Villanova of The Jersey Journal wrote that St. Anthony "is seemingly always on the brink of closure, considering the razor thin margins."

In April 2017, officials at St. Anthony formally announced the high school would close at the end of the 2016–17 school year, due to declining enrollment (i.e. only 160 students in 2017) and the lack of funding to cover expenses. Increasing expenses were linked to the hiring of non-teaching order educators, and Bob Cook wrote in Forbes that gentrification may have contributed to the school's decline.

In efforts to reverse the decision of the school's looming closure, New Jersey Governor Chris Christie announced a challenge during an April 2017 appearance on radio station WFAN.  Christie asked for the commissioners of Major League Baseball, the National Football League, the National Basketball Association, and the National Hockey League to each donate $125,000, in order to meet the school's minimum investment need of $500,000. Despite this, the school was closed in June 2017.

Athletics
The St. Anthony High School Friars competed in the Hudson County Interscholastic League, which was established following a reorganization of sports leagues in Northern New Jersey by the New Jersey State Interscholastic Athletic Association. They practiced at White Eagle Hall and often played at the Jersey City Armory.

Boys' basketball 
The boys' basketball varsity team, coached by Bob Hurley, had been, for over 39 years, the most dominant high school team in the country. St. Anthony had won a national record 28 state championships, set with a 74–44 win in the 2008 sectional championship game over Trenton Catholic Academy to win the Parochial B state title, the program's 25th.

The team has won state championships in:

Non-Public C 
 1968 (vs. Sacred Heart High School in the finals)
 1969 (vs. St. Augustine Preparatory School)
 1973 (vs. St. Joseph's High School of Camden)
 1974 (vs. St. Joseph's of Camden), 1976 (vs. Sacred Heart)
 1977 (vs. St. Joseph's of Camden)

Non-Public B 
 1980 (vs. St. Mary's High School of South Amboy)
 1981 (vs. Wildwood Catholic High School)
 1983 (vs. St. Peter the Apostle High School of New Brunswick)
 1984 (vs. St. Peter of New Brunswick)
 1985 (vs. St. Peter of New Brunswick)
 1986 (vs. St. Augustine)
 1987 (vs. St. Joseph High School of Hammonton)
 1988 (vs. Wildwood Catholic)
 1989 (vs. St. Rose)
 1990 (vs. St. Peter of New Brunswick)
 1991 (vs. Eustace Preparatory School)
 1993 (vs. St. Augustine)
 1995 (vs. St. Peter of New Brunswick)
 1996 (vs. Eustace)
 1997 (vs. St. Augustine)
 2001 (vs. St. Augustine)
 2002 (vs. St. Rose)
 2004 (Red Bank Catholic High School)
 2008 (vs. Trenton Catholic Academy)
 2011 (vs. Cardinal McCarrick High School)
 2012 (vs. Gill St. Bernard's School)
 2016 (vs. Roselle Catholic High School)

The program also won the Tournament of Champions 13 times:
 1989 (vs. Elizabeth High School in the inaugural tournament by a score of 62–55)
 1991 (vs. Seton Hall Preparatory School, 63–39)
 1993 (vs. Middle Township High School), 84–59)
 1995 (vs. Shawnee High School, 47–44)
 1996 (vs. Shawnee, 65–57 in overtime)
 1997 (vs. Seton Hall Prep, 69–63)
 2001 (vs. Malcolm X Shabazz High School, 48–47)
 2002 (vs. Neptune High School, 69–42)
 2004 (vs. Bloomfield Tech High School, 67–55)
 2008 (vs. Science Park High School, 69–36)
 2011 (vs. Plainfield High School, 61–49)
 2012 (vs. Plainfield, 66–62)
 2016 (vs. Linden High School, 55–38)

With a 61–49 win in the 2011 Tournament of Champions over Plainfield High School, the St. Anthony team completed a 33–0 undefeated season, won its 11th Tournament of Champions and was recognized by USA Today with its fourth national championship. The programs 27 NJSIAA state group titles are the most of any school in the state.

St. Anthony produced over 150 players to Division I basketball programs, all on full scholarships. Hurley has coached five first-round NBA draft picks, including his own son, Bobby Hurley.

In popular media 
His team has been the subject of the book titled The Street Stops Here and a 2010 documentary film based on the book. That year, documentary crews captured the entire season as the Friars finished the season as the #1 team in the country.

Girls' basketball 
The 1984 girls basketball team won the Non-Public Group B state championship, defeating Wildwood Catholic High School by a score of 59-46 in the tournament final.

Baseball 
The baseball team won the Non-Public Group C state championship in 1970 (defeating St. Joseph High School of Hammonton in the tournament final), 1971 (vs. Saint Augustine Preparatory School) and 1972 (vs. St. Joseph of Hammonton), and won the Group B title in 1987 (vs. Eustace Preparatory School). The 1971 team came back from a 2-0 deficit to win the Parochial C title with a 3-2 win against St. Augustine.

State and national championships

Notable alumni 

 Kyle Anderson (born 1993), basketball player for San Antonio Spurs.
 Willie Banks (born 1969), former Major League Baseball pitcher.
 Petey Cipriano (born 1983), basketball coach and former player who is currently an assistant coach at Southern University.
 Hallice Cooke (born 1995), guard for Nevada Wolf Pack basketball team.
 Donald Copeland (born 1984), former professional basketball player who is the head coach of the Wagner Seahawks men's basketball team.
 Terry Dehere (born 1971), Politician, former NBA basketball player.
 Jerome Frink (born 1993), professional basketball player for Domingo Paulino Santiago of the Dominican Santiago League.
 Jimmy Hall (born 1994), basketball player in the Israeli National League.
 Bobby Hurley (born 1971), former NBA player and current head basketball coach at Arizona State University.
 Dan Hurley (born 1973), former point guard at Seton Hall University and current head basketball coach at the University of Connecticut.
 Lucky Jones (born 1993, class of 2011), professional basketball player for Aris of the Greek Basket League.
 Kaws (born 1974 as Brian Donnelly), graffiti artist, limited-edition clothing and toy designer.
 Myles Mack (born 1993), professional basketball player for GTK Gliwice of the Polish Basketball League.
 Markis McDuffie (born 1997), professional basketball player for Napoli Basket of the Italian Lega Basket Serie A.
 Roshown McLeod (born 1975), played in three NBA seasons from 1999 to 2001, for the Atlanta Hawks and briefly for the Philadelphia 76ers.
 Derrick Mercer, basketball player who played point guard  for American University.
 Josh A. Moore (born 1980), former NBA basketball player.
 Ahmad Nivins (born 1987), professional basketball power forward.
 Ashton Pankey (born 1992), basketball player.
 Rodrick Rhodes (born 1973), former NBA basketball player.
 David Rivers (born 1965), former NBA player for the Los Angeles Lakers, played at Notre Dame.
 Terrence Roberts (born 1985), former member of the Syracuse Orange men's basketball team.
 Mike Rosario (born 1990), professional basketball player for Piratas de Quebradillas of the Baloncesto Superior Nacional.
 Tyshawn Taylor (born 1990), professional basketball player.
 John Valentin (born 1968), former professional baseball player who played in ten MLB seasons from 1992 to 2001, for the Boston Red Sox and for the New York Mets in 2002.
 Luther Wright (born 1971), former player in the NBA for the Utah Jazz.

References

External links
St. Anthony High School
St. Anthony Athletics
Data for St. Anthony High School, National Center for Education Statistics

1952 establishments in New Jersey
2017 disestablishments in New Jersey
Educational institutions established in 1952
Educational institutions disestablished in 2017
High schools in Jersey City, New Jersey
Catholic secondary schools in New Jersey
Roman Catholic Archdiocese of Newark
Sports in Hudson County, New Jersey